Sunwing is a children's book written in 1999 by Canadian author Kenneth Oppel. It is the second book in the Silverwing series, preceded by Silverwing and succeeded by Firewing.

Plot summary

Part I
Shade, Marina and their friends in the Silverwing colony fly in the middle of the winter in hopes of finding Shade's father, Cassiel. The bats find a Human building, and fly inside, thinking that Cassiel might be there. Inside, they find an artificial forest filled with many other kinds of bats. The Silverwings discover that they cannot escape and that Cassiel is not there. Panic arises when several bats disappear, including Shade's friend, Chinook. Shade and Marina escape by way of a river that runs through the forest and find another artificial forest, this one filled with owls.

Upon arriving in the other dome, Shade and Marina befriend Orestes, a boreal owl and the son of the owl king. Owls begin to disappear, as well, and Shade discovers that humans are experimenting on them. Shade has a run-in with Goth, whom he is surprised to find alive, let alone in the same facility. Eventually, Shade, Orestes and Goth are captured by the humans while Marina escapes. The humans shave a patch of Shade's fur, attach a disc to his belly and a stud to his ear, and put him in an airplane flying south. Inside, he finds Chinook, who is confused about the purpose of the metal discs and studs.

Part II
Marina is clinging to the plane, but is soon thrown off by the turbulence. She breaks Frieda, Ariel and two other Silverwings out of the building. They then encounter a Graywing colony and learn that the owls have laid siege to Hibernaculum, believing the actions of Goth and Throbb to have been perpetrated by Silverwings. Devastated at this news, they decide to recruit additional helpers in Bridge City, which is possibly the only safe haven left for bats.

In the plane, Shade and Chinook escape to see that they are on the outskirts of a city beside a massive jungle, which Shade realizes to be Goth's homeland. They see that the other bats wearing the earpiece are induced to fly into a target building. Shade reels back when he sees that the metal discs explode when the bats carrying them reach the target. Shade and Chinook are able to free themselves of the discs and find a group of survivors who are hiding from Goth's species, the Vampyrum spectrum. Shade begins to learn more about them from a weakened bat named Ishmael.

Part III
Goth, reaching his home in an ancient Mayan pyramid, is anointed king and told of a prophecy by his priest, Voxzaco. According to the prophecy, if a hundred hearts are offered to their god, Cama zotz, the coming solar eclipse will last forever, allowing Zotz to rule both the Upperworld and Underworld. Meanwhile, the Silverwings make their way to Bridge City and hold a council of war about the rumoured threats to the bats. The northern rat king, Romulus (now estranged from Remus), agrees to help them. He puts them in touch with Cortez of the Southern rats, who can access waterways to Central America.

Shade hastens to rescue his father, who they discover is now a captive of Goth's clan. On the way, both Chinook and the owl prince, Orestes, are captured by a small group of Vampyrum spectrum. While contemplating the loss of Chinook and Orestes, Shade notices something burrowing into Statue Haven and finds himself reunited with his mother and Marina. Shade, Marina, Ariel and a group of rats led by General Cortez enter the pyramid and a battle ensues. Shade discovers his father and Ishmael sacrifices himself to save his trapped brother. Voxzaco realizes that there is no way to sacrifice one hundred hearts before the brief eclipse ends, except by using the explosive disc brought by Goth. He therefore attempts to drop it on the pyramid. As it falls, Shade uses sound waves to keep it in place just long enough for most northern bats to escape. Exhausted, Shade lets it drop afterward, destroying the pyramid and killing all inside.

Victorious, the northern group returns to Bridge City and meets with the owl king for a truce. With Orestes' help, Boreal agrees to let bats fly in daylight. Afterward, Frieda, the eldest of the Silverwings, dies peacefully. A new Tree Haven is then built with Shade's mother, Ariel, as the new elder. Shade gets to know his father and the family adopts Chinook, who was orphaned by the bombing. In the last scene, Marina reveals to Shade that Chinook had offered to make her his mate. She says that she refused, intending to be Shade's mate instead.

Characters
Shade - a Silverwing seeking to reunite with his missing father. Shade and a small group from his colony make their way to a human building, where Cassiel was last seen, within which are hundreds of bats bathing in what is perceived as paradise. When things go awry and bats are taken, Shade seeks a means of escape, only to find himself at the mercy of the humans' experimentation. Shade is then weaponized and sent to the southern jungle. Despite surviving, Shade learns that his father is still alive and acts to save Cassiel and the other bats held prisoner by the Vampyrum Spectrum before they can be used as sacrifices to Cama Zotz.

Marina - a banded Brightwing who Shade had befriended on his last journey, Marina joins Shade in his search for Cassiel. While Marina is more accepting of the supposed paradise provided by the humans, she still joins Shade in his attempted escape, where she realizes the true horrors behind the building's operations. When Shade is taken, Marina hurries to warn her friends, then sets out to find Shade. She and Ariel arrive in the jungle just in time to help Shade during the eclipse, after which they return to Bridge City with the survivors and prevent an all-out war between the birds and the bats. 

Chinook - a Silverwing with whom Shade had dared to take a glimpse of the sun. Once Shade's bully, who joins Shade in his search for his father. He has a keen interest in Marina. Chinook is one of the many bats taken by the humans to be weaponized and shipped to the jungle in the south. Thanks to Shade, Chinook survives the ordeal, but is later taken as a prisoner of the Vampyrum Spectrum, intended to be used as a sacrifice for Cama Zotz.

Goth (deceased) - a cannibalistic Vampyrum Spectrum bat who survived being struck by lightning, Goth follows the guidance of Zotz to exact his revenge against Shade and return to the jungle. Goth arrives at the same human building as Shade, where he is weaponized, just as the other bats and owls in the building are. Upon returning to his home in the jungle, Goth is welcomed as the new king, and a plot unfolds to perform a mass sacrifice during an eclipse in pursuit of eternal night. When the plans go awry, Goth is killed by an ensuing explosion intentionally triggered by Voxzaco to satisfy Zotz' request for 100 souls during the eclipse.

Orestes - a Boreal owl, prince of the Northern Realms, Orestes was drawn to the human building, where he ultimately found himself trapped. When Shade and Marina came to the owls' forest within the building via the river, Orestes attacked, blaming the bats for his imprisonment. When they retreated to the river, Orestes followed and was shocked to encounter Goth in a neighboring forest enclosure, even moreso when Shade defended him. Before any of them could be killed, the humans used knockout gas and collected Orestes alongside Goth to be weaponized and sent to Central America. Here, Orestes survives and seeks out Shade, but after he is freed from the explosive attached to him, Orestes is taken captive by the Vampyrum Spectrum, intended to be used as a sacrifice during the eclipse. Thanks to Shade's efforts, Orestes survives the eclipse and ventures to Bridge City, where he pleads Shade's case with his father and helps garner peace.

Frieda (deceased)- the banded head-elder of the Silverwing colony, she ventures with Shade to the human building in search of Cassiel, where she and the rest of the colony bask in the paradise provided, courtesy of the humans. After learning of the horrors behind the humans' machination, Frieda escapes alongside Marina, and joins her and Ariel in a mission to rescue Shade from the south. She later dies of old age in Bridge City.

Ariel - a Silverwing recently reunited with her son and seeking to reunite with her mate, Cassiel. After discovering the horrors that awaited them at the human building, Ariel, Marina, and Frieda set out to rescue Shade, who had been subject to the humans' experiments and brought to the south.

Cassiel - a banded Silverwing who disappeared the year prior and was mistaken for dead. Cassiel had ventured to the human building and was among those experimented upon and sent to the jungles of the south to be used as a weapon. Surviving in a fractured colony, Cassiel was taken prisoner by the Vampyrum Spectrum and intended to be utilized as a sacrifice during an eclipse in honor of Cama Zotz.

Ishmael (deceased) - a Silverwing who had been weaponized by the humans and brought to the jungle. Although he survived, Ishmael was captured by the Vampyrum Spectrum to be utilized as a sacrifice to Cama Zotz. However, Ishmael escaped and returned to warn the fractured southern colony. While reluctant at first, Ishmael decides to help Shade free the captured bats, though he dies in the process.

Caliban - a Mastiff who had been weaponized by the humans and sent to the southern jungle. He acts as the leader of the fractured colony of survivors in Cassiel's place, and seeks to return to the north. Although hesitant to act, Caliban aids Shade in rescuing those captured by the Vampyrum Spectrum during the eclipse.

Achilles - a Graywing elder who had taken part in the rebellion 15 years prior. After escaping the human building, Frieda leads the escapees to Achilles after spotting his traveling colony of survivors, where he reveals that the owls had taken Hibernaculum and imprisoned the entirety of the Silverwing colony. Achilles then leads the group with the survivors to Bridge City, anticipating an all-out war with the owls. Thanks to Shade's efforts, which involved saving King Boreal's son from the Vampyrum Spectrum during the eclipse down south, the war is averted.

Arcadia - a pompous banded Hoary elder who arrived at the human building after Cassiel had been taken to the south. Arcadia believes the human building to be the enactment of Nocturna's Promise and opposes any who claim otherwise. When bats begin to go missing because of human experimentation, Arcadia expresses her belief that it must be a part of the Promise. Even after Marina unearths the truth, Arcadia refuses to listen and instead convinces many other bats not to listen to Marina and escape.

Halo - head elder of the Freetail colony, and of Bridge City, where Halo met with elders from hundreds of colonies to discuss the coming war between the birds and the bats. Due to Shade's efforts, this war was ultimately prevented and peace was made with King Boreal and the owls.

Voxzaco - a cannibalistic Vampyrum Spectrum and high priest of the Central American colony. Voxzaco informs Goth of a prospective ritual dedicated to Cama Zotz, in which they would sacrifice 100 hearts during an oncoming eclipse and be gifted eternal night in return. When the ceremony goes awry and the eclipse is about to end, Voxzaco takes a bomb high above the pyramid in order to perform a hasty mass-sacrifice, killing himself and Goth in the process, but ultimately failing to satisfy Zotz' demand.

King Boreal - a Boreal owl, king of the Northern Realms, King Boreal believed he had lost his son in the midst of an oncoming war with the bats; however, thanks to Shade's efforts, this war was ultimately averted and peace was made with the bats.

Ramiel - a Silverwing taken to the south alongside his brother, Ishmael. Ramiel had been taken hostage by the Vampyrum Spectrum with the intent of being used as a sacrifice during the eclipse to create eternal night. Although he survives, it is only because his brother takes his place in the ceremony.

Plato & Isis (deceased) - two Silverwings, parents to Chinook, who join their son in following Shade on his search for Cassiel. Both are taken and weaponized by the humans and shipped to the southern jungle, where the bombs equipped to their bodies detonate, killing them and orphaning Chinook.

Icarus (deceased) - a banded Silverwing and friend of Cassiel, he leads Shade and a small group from their colony to the human building where Cassiel had last been seen. He is taken by the humans to be weaponized and shipped to the southern jungle, where the bomb equipped to his body detonates, killing him.

Windsling - a Silverwing who traveled with Shade to the human building in search of Cassiel. Upon learning the horrors of the human experimentation on bats, Windsling is one of six who leave with Marina, Ariel, and Frieda and subsequently join Achilles Graywing's colony headed for Bridge City.

Romulus - King of the Rats, Romulus was once considered a freak by his brother and willingly allowed himself to be treated like a beast, due to skin that stretched between his limbs. After Remus flees, Romulus takes his rightful place as ruler of the Rats and brings them to Bridge City to discuss the coming war the bats face against the owls. Here, he reunites with Marina and offers his attendants' services in guiding her and Ariel to Central America.

Ulysses & Harbinger - two rats who serve Romulus, they help Marina and Ariel reach Central America in order to rescue Shade.

Cortez - leader of the rats in Central America, where he conspires with the bats in order to free his imprisoned brethren, the bats, and the owls from the Vampyrum Spectrum during the eclipse.

Note
The group responsible for the bombing in Central America is still at large. Whether they were military, terrorists or something else entirely is anyone's guess.

Publication history
Sunwing was first released in Canada in August 1999. It was followed with its release in the United Kingdom and the United States in January 2000 and February 2000 respectively. Below is the release details for the first edition hardback and paperback copies in these three publication regions.

1999, CAN, HarperCollins , Pub date August 12, 1999, Trade paperback
2000, UK, Hodder Children's Books , Pub date January 20, 2000, Paperback
2000, US, Simon & Schuster , Pub date February 1, 2000, Hardback
2001, US, Aladdin , Pub date July 10, 2001, Paperback
2001, CAN, HarperCollins , Pub date July 19, 2001, Paperback

1999 Canadian novels
Canadian fantasy novels
Novels by Kenneth Oppel
Silverwing (series)
Children's novels about animals
Children's fantasy novels
HarperCollins books
1999 children's books